Tetra-tert-butylmethane is a hypothetical organic compound with formula C17H36, consisting of four tert-butyl groups bonded to a central carbon atom. It would be an alkane, specifically the most compact branched isomer of heptadecane.

Some calculations suggests this compound cannot exist due to the steric hindrance among the closely packed tert-butyl groups, which would make it one of the smallest, if not the smallest itself, saturated and acyclic hydrocarbon that cannot exist.  

Other calculations suggest that the molecule would be stable, with the C–C bonds to the central ("methane") carbon having a length of 166.1 pm — longer than the typical C−C bond in order to reduce steric effects, but still shorter than those found in some other real molecules.

References

Alkanes
Hypothetical chemical compounds
Tert-butyl compounds